I Killed Rasputin is a 1967 Italo-Franco biographical film directed by Robert Hossein. Gert Fröbe stars as the main subject, Grigori Rasputin. It is based on the work Lost Splendor by Felix Yusupov, a nobleman and participant in the murder of Rasputin. The script was approved by Yusupov and he also agreed to appear in the film. In the introductory interview of the film, Yusupov demonstrated that his loathing for Rasputin remained undiminished. Filming began at the Billancourt Studios in Paris in December 1966. The film opened the 1967 Cannes Film Festival and later that year was released theatrically in France on 3 May.

Plot
Grigori Rasputin becomes a fixture of Russia's Imperial Court after saving the life of Alexei Nikolaevich, Tsarevich of Russia, the haemophiliac heir to the throne. However as war breaks out, Rasputin's enemies see him as a cause and plot fatal revenge against the Russian mystic.

Cast
Gert Fröbe as Grigori Rasputin
Peter McEnery as Felix Yusupov
Robert Hossein as Serge Hukhotin
Geraldine Chaplin as Mounia Golovine
Ivan Desny as Grand Duke Alexander Mikhailovich of Russia
Roger Pigaut as Vladimir Purishkevich
Princess Ira von Fürstenberg as Irina Yusupova
Patrick Balkany as Grand Duke Dmitri Pavlovich of Russia
Nicolas Vogel as Dr. Lazovert
France Delahalle as Grand Duchess Xenia Alexandrovna of Russia
Katia Tchenko as A follower of Rasputin

References

External links
 

1967 films
French biographical drama films
Italian biographical drama films
1960s biographical drama films
Films about assassinations
Films set in Russia
Films set in the 1900s
Films set in the 1910s
Films about Grigori Rasputin
1960s historical drama films
French historical drama films
Italian historical drama films
Films shot at Billancourt Studios
Films directed by Robert Hossein
1960s Italian films
1960s French films